Posht-e Tang-e Gol Gol (also Romanized as Posht-e Tang-e Gol Gol; also known as Posht-e Tang-e Khayyāţ) is a village in Firuzabad Rural District, Firuzabad District, Selseleh County, Lorestan Province, Iran. At the 2006 census, its population was 15, in 4 families.

References 

Towns and villages in Selseleh County